Ahmadou Kourouma (24 November 1927 – 11 December 2003) was an Ivorian novelist.

Life
The eldest son of a distinguished Malinké family, Ahmadou Kourouma was born in 1927 in Boundiali, Côte d'Ivoire.  Raised by his uncle, he initially pursued studies in Bamako, Mali.  From 1950 to 1954, when his country was still under French colonial control, he participated in French military campaigns in Indochina, after which he journeyed to France to study mathematics in Lyon.

Kourouma returned to his native Côte d'Ivoire after it won its independence in 1960, yet he quickly found himself questioning the government of Félix Houphouët-Boigny.  After brief imprisonment, Kourouma spent several years in exile, first in Algeria (1964–69), then in Cameroon (1974–84) and Togo (1984–94), before finally returning to live in Côte d'Ivoire.

Determined to speak out against the betrayal of legitimate African aspirations at the dawn of independence, Kourouma was drawn into an experiment in fiction. His first novel, Les Soleils des indépendances (The Suns of Independence, 1970) contains a critical treatment of post-colonial governments in Africa. Twenty years later, his second book Monnè, outrages et défis, a history of a century of colonialism, was published.  In 1998, he published En attendant le vote des bêtes sauvages (translated as Waiting for the Wild Beasts to Vote), a satire of postcolonial Africa in the style of Voltaire, with elements of the Epic of Sundiata, in which a griot recounts the story of a tribal hunter's transformation into a dictator, inspired by president Gnassingbé Eyadéma of Togo.  In 2000, he published Allah n'est pas obligé (translated as Allah is Not Obliged), a tale of an orphan who becomes a child soldier when traveling to visit his aunt in Liberia.

At the outbreak of civil war in Côte d'Ivoire in 2002, Kourouma stood against the war as well as against the concept of Ivorian nationalism, calling it "an absurdity which has led us to chaos."  President Laurent Gbagbo accused him of supporting rebel groups from the north of the country.

In France, each of Kourouma's novels was greeted with great acclaim, sold exceptionally well, and was showered with prizes, including the Prix Renaudot in the year 2000 and the Prix Goncourt des Lycéens for Allah n'est pas obligé. In the English-speaking world, Kourouma has yet to make much of an impression: despite some positive reviews, his work remains largely unknown outside university classes in African fiction. Allah Is Not Obliged received its first English translation in 2006. 

At the time of his death, in Lyon, Kourouma was working on a sequel to Allah n'est pas obligé, entitled Quand on refuse on dit non (translated roughly as "When One Disagrees, One Says No"), in which the protagonist of the first novel, a child soldier, is demobilized and returns to his home in Côte d'Ivoire, where a new regional conflict has arisen.

Bibliography
Les Soleils des indépendances, Presses de l'Université de Montréal, 1968
The Suns of Independence, Translator Adrian Adams, Holmes & Meier, 1981, 
Le diseur de vérité — drama, 1972; Acoria, 1998, 
Monnè, Éditions du Seuil, 1990, 
Monnew: a novel, Translator Nidra Poller, Mercury House, 1993, 
En attendant le vote des bêtes sauvages, Éditions du Seuil, 1998, 

; Illustrators Claude Millet, Denise Millet; Editions Gallimard, 2011, 
Allah n'est pas obligé, Seuil, 2000, 
; Random House Digital, Inc., 2007, 
Quand on refuse on dit non, Editor Gilles Carpentier, Éditions du Seuil, 2005,

Awards and honors 

 Grand prix littéraire d'Afrique noire (1969), for Les Soleils des indépendances
 Prix Maillé-Latour-Landry (1970), for Les Soleils des indépendances
 Prix Tropiques (1998), for En attendant le vote des bêtes sauvages
 Grand prix Poncetton (1998), for En attendant le vote des bêtes sauvages
 Prix du Livre Inter (1999), for En attendant le vote des bêtes sauvages
 Grand prix Jean-Giono (2000), for Allah n'est pas obligé
 Prix Renaudot (2000), for Allah n'est pas obligé
 Prix Goncourt des Lycéens (2000), for Allah n'est pas obligé

References

External links
 The official Allah is Not Obliged website
Christopher Cox, "Ahmadou Kourouma’s Allah is not Obliged", Words without Borders, 2007.
"Allah n'est pas obligé D'Ahmadou Kourouma", Cinquième zone n° 102, 2 December 2000
Ahmadou Kourouma at The Complete Review
Ahmadou Kourouma at webAfriqa

1927 births
2003 deaths
20th-century dramatists and playwrights
20th-century male writers
20th-century novelists
21st-century male writers
21st-century novelists
Grand prix Jean Giono recipients
Ivorian dramatists and playwrights
Ivorian exiles
Ivorian expatriates in Algeria
Ivorian expatriates in Mali
Ivorian male writers
Ivorian novelists
Male dramatists and playwrights
Male novelists
Mandinka
People from Savanes District
People of French West Africa
Prix du Livre Inter winners
Prix Goncourt des lycéens winners
Prix Renaudot winners